Sainte Therese Church is the largest Catholic church in Curepipe and one of the largest churches in Mauritius.

It includes two high schools, one boys only and one girls only. It is situated on the main street of Curepipe about 100 meters from the town hall.

See also
Catholic Church in Mauritius

References

Churches in Mauritius
Curepipe